The Indonesian television mystery music game show I Can See Your Voice Indonesia premiered the third season on MNCTV on 11 March 2018.

This season also saw  defeated Iis Dahlia, airing on its first episode under battle format applied on ICSYV counterpart, which was initially used by spin-off programme Giọng ải giọng ai.

Gameplay

Formats
For this season, there are two different formats:

Original format
Under the original format, the guest artist can eliminate one or two mystery singers after each round. The game concludes with the last mystery singer standing which depends on the outcome of a duet performance with a guest artist.

Battle format (episodes 13 and 17)
Under the battle format (adopted from Giọng ải giọng ai), both opponents can eliminate one singer each in the first two rounds, and then both can choose one singer each to join the final performance in the third round. At the end of the game, the conditions for mystery singers chosen by opposing guest artists depending on the outcome of a final performance, if:

Rewards
If the singer is good, he/she will feature on a privilege video; if the singer is bad, he/she wins .

Rounds
Each episode presents the guest artist with seven people whose identities and singing voices are kept concealed until they are eliminated to perform on the "stage of truth" or remain in the end to perform the final duet.

Episodes

Guest artists

Panelists

Notes

References

I Can See Your Voice Indonesia
2018 Indonesian television seasons